A  (a Hopi word) was a small hole or indentation in the floor of a  (pithouse). Kivas were used by the Ancestral Puebloans and continue to be used by modern-day Puebloans. The  symbolizes the portal through which their ancient ancestors first emerged to enter the present world.

Hopi mythology (and similar traditions in other Pueblo cultures such as the Zuni and Acoma) states that this is the hole from which the first peoples of this world entered. It is from this point that the "First Peoples" of the Earth began to divide and separate, becoming tribes. The original sipapu is said to be located in the Grand Canyon.

References

Citations

Works cited

Further reading
 

Native American religion
Puebloan architectural elements
Underworld
Hopi culture